Gerberga of Lorraine (c. 925–995) was a lady of the highest European nobility who became the wife of Megingoz of Guelders around 945.

She was a daughter of Godfrey, Count Palatine of Lotharingia and Ermentrude, possibly the eldest daughter of Charles the Simple. On her father's side she was a granddaughter of Gerhard I of Metz and Oda of Saxony, daughter of Otto I, Duke of Saxony.

She founded the Vilich Abbey, northeast of Bonn. She died in 995. Megingoz died shortly afterwards, after 998.

Children

With Megingoz, she had the following children:

Godfrey (d. 977), killed at a young age in a campaign against Bohemia
Irmtrud of Avalgau, who married Herbert of Wetterau
Adelaide, Abbess of Vilich
Alberada
Bertada (d. 1000), abbess in Cologne

920s births
995 deaths
Year of birth uncertain